Arslan Tash ivory inscription is a small ivory plaque with an Aramaic language inscription found in 1928 in Arslan Tash in northern Syria (ancient Hadātu) by a team of French archaeologists led by François Thureau-Dangin.

It has been dated to the early 800s BCE, on the basis of the name "Hazael" in the inscription, who has been speculated to be the Biblical Hazael of Aram-Damascus. The inscription is known as KAI 232.

The plaque, along with many other ivory items, was found on the site of a palace from the 8th century BC belonging to the city's Neo-Assyrian governor.

Three parts of the plaque have been found; two parts fit together, the third one does not. The two joined parts together are 2 cm high and 7.9 cm long, while the third part is 1.9 cm high and 3.2 cm long. The entire inscription on the plate is usually reconstructed as follows:

This ... son of Amma, engraved for our lord Hazael in the year ...

Currently, the plaque is in the Louvre collection under the inventory number AO 11489.

Bibliography 
 Clyde E. Fant, Mitchell G. Reddish, "Lost Treasures of the Bible", Wm. B. Eerdmans Publishing Co., Grand Rapids / Cambridge 2008, pp. 106–109.

References

External links 
 - Arslan Tash plaque (AO 11489) on the official Louvre website

Near East and Middle East antiquities of the Louvre
Aramaic inscriptions
Archaeological discoveries in Syria
France–Syria relations
KAI inscriptions